Maua Abeid Daftari is a Member of Parliament in the National Assembly of Tanzania.

Appointments 

 Deputy Minister for Infrastructure Development in 2007. As Deputy Minister she made a proposal to convert the gauge of Tanzania Railways Central line from narrow gauge to standard gauge.

Sources 
 Parliament of Tanzania website
 CV

Living people
Members of the National Assembly (Tanzania)
1953 births
Chama Cha Mapinduzi MPs
Government ministers of Tanzania